Mingir is a commune in Hîncești District, Moldova. It is composed of two villages, Mingir and Semionovca.

Notable people
 Valeriu Lazăr
 Nicolae Gribincea
 Tudor Casapu

Bibliography 
Lupanciuc, Iacob, Comuna Mingir: File de istorie, Chișinău, Editura Universul, 2004,

References

External links

 FILE DIN ISTORIA SATULUI MINGIR

Communes of Hîncești District